Ad Damer is a district of River Nile state, Sudan.

References

Districts of Sudan